Guanabara City Futebol Clube, better known as Guanabara City, is a football club in the city of Goiânia, in the state of Goiás.

History

Founded on November 15, 1999 and legally registered as a private sports association on December 14 of the same year, Guanabara City will make its professional football debut in the third division of Campeonato Goiano 2021.

Players

Squad 2021

References 

Football clubs in Goiás